
Year 504 (DIV) was a leap year starting on Thursday (link will display the full calendar) of the Julian calendar. At the time, it was known as the Year of the Consulship of Nicomachus without colleague (or, less frequently, year 1257 Ab urbe condita). The denomination 504 for this year has been used since the early medieval period, when the Anno Domini calendar era became the prevalent method in Europe for naming years.

Events 
 By place 
 Byzantine Empire 
 War with Sassanid Persia: Emperor Anastasius I gains the upper hand in Armenia, with the renewed investment of Amida.
 King  Kavadh I hands over the fortress-city of Amida, and agrees to an armistice with the Byzantine Empire.

 Europe 
 King Theodoric the Great defeats the Gepids, and drives them out of their homeland (Pannonia). 
 The Ostrogoths sack Belgrade, on the Danube and Sava rivers (modern Serbia).

 Mesoamerica 
 A major expansion of Copán's ceremonial center, the Acropolis complex, is undertaken by B'alam Nehn (Waterlily Jaguar), the seventh ruler (ajaw) of the southeastern Maya city (approximate date).

 By topic 
 Religion 
 Theodoric the Great builds the Basilica of Sant'Apollinare Nuovo, originally dedicated to Christ the Redeemer.

Births

Deaths 
 Muyal Jol, ruler of Copan

References